The Washington SyCip Graduate School of Business, or simply WSGSB, is the business school of the Asian Institute of Management in Manila, Philippines. It is one of the leading business schools in the Asia-Pacific region, especially in the fields of finance and marketing. The SyCip MBA program is one of the most recognized in the region.

Programs
The school offers the following programs: 
 Executive Master of Business Administration 
 Master of Business Administration  
 Master of Management

Faculty
The faculty is led by its School Head Felipe O. Calderon, CPA, CMA, PhD.

External links
Official website
Alumni network

Asian Institute of Management
Business schools in the Philippines